Lake Parime or Lake Parima is a legendary lake located in South America. It was reputedly the location of the fabled city of El Dorado, also known as Manoa, much sought-after by European explorers. Repeated attempts to find the lake failed to confirm its existence, and it was dismissed as a myth along with the city. The search for Lake Parime led explorers to map the rivers and other features of southern Venezuela, northern Brazil, and southwestern Guyana before the lake's existence was definitively disproved in the early 19th century. Some explorers proposed that the seasonal flooding of the Rupununi savannah may have been misidentified as a lake. Recent geological investigations suggest that a lake may have existed in northern Brazil, but that it dried up some time in the 18th century. Both "Manoa" (Arawak language) and "Parime" (Carib language) are believed to mean "big lake".

Two other mythical lakes, Lake Xarayes or Xaraies (sometimes called Lake Eupana), and Lake Cassipa, are often depicted on early maps of South America.

First attempts at discovery

Walter Raleigh, 1595

Sir Walter Raleigh began the exploration of the Guianas in earnest in 1594 and described the city of Manoa, which he believed to be the legendary city of El Dorado, as being located on Lake Parime far up the Orinoco River in Venezuela. Much of his exploration is documented in his books The Discoverie of the Large, Rich, and Bewtiful Empyre of Guiana, published first in 1596, and The Discovery of Guiana, and the Journal of the Second Voyage Thereto, published in 1606. How much of Raleigh's work is true and how much is fabricated remains unclear: His account indicates that he only succeeded in navigating up the Orinoco as far as Angostura, (what is now Ciudad Bolívar) and did not come close to the supposed location of Lake Parime. Raleigh says of the lake:

According to Raleigh, the lake itself was the source of the gold possessed by the people of Manoa:

Lawrence Kemys, 1596
In 1596 Raleigh sent Lieutenant Lawrence Kemys back to Guyana, to gather more information about the lake and the golden city. Kemys mapped the location of Amerindian tribes between the Amazon and the Orinoco and made geographical, geological and botanical reports. He described the coast of Guiana in detail in his Relation of the Second Voyage to Guiana (1596) and says that indigenous people of Guiana traveled inland by canoe and land passages towards a large body of water on the shores of which he supposed was located Manoa, Golden City of El Dorado. One of these rivers leading south into the interior of Guiana was the Essequibo. Kemys wrote that the Indians called this river "brother of the Orenoque [Orinoco]" and that this river of Essequibo, or Devoritia,

Early maps
  

As a result of Raleigh's work, maps began to appear depicting El Dorado and Lake Parime. One of the first was the elder Jodocus Hondius' Nieuwe Caerte van het Wonderbaer ende Goudrycke Landt Guiana, which was published in 1598. Hondius' map depicts an elongated Lake Parime south of the Orinoco River, with the majority of the lake positioned south of the equator, and with Manoa on the northern shore, towards the eastern half of the lake. Manoa is noted as "the greatest city in the entire world". Hondius' map was subsequently copied by Theodore de Bry and published in his popular Grands Voyages in 1599. When Hondius published a completely revised edition of Mercator's Atlas in 1608, it included a map of South America featuring Lake Parime with the majority of the lake located south of the equator, and with Manoa again along the northern shore, although not quite so far east.

Cartographer Guillaume Delisle was among the first to cast doubts on the lake's existence. In a  map of Guyana printed in 1730, he included an outline of the lake, then replaced it with the notation: "It is in these regions that most authors place the Lake Parime and the City of Manoa of El Dorado." Delisle reluctantly included a lake in southwestern Guyana on several subsequent maps, but did not name it or the city of Manoa.

The lake was printed on maps throughout the 17th and 18th centuries and up until the early 19th century. Some cartographers and naturalists moved the lake more to the southeast of the Orinoco River and north of the Amazon river, often situating it south of the mountains that border Venezuela, Guiana, and Brazil. However, by the late 18th century, failure to confirm the lake's existence led to its removal from most maps. A 1792 map of the Rio Branco by José Joaquin Freire shows no sign of a lake, although there is now a Parimé River.

17th century explorations

Thomas Roe, 1611
In early 1611 Sir Thomas Roe, on a mission to the West Indies for Henry Frederick, Prince of Wales, sailed his 200-ton ship, the Lion's Claw, some  up the Amazon, then took a party of canoes up the Oyapock River in search of Lake Parime, negotiating thirty-two rapids and traveling about  before they ran out of food and had to turn back.

Raleigh and Kemys, 1617
In March 1617, Raleigh and Kemys returned to Venezuela in search of Lake Parime and El Dorado. The expedition failed to uncover any new evidence of the lake and ended with the death of Raleigh's son Walter and the suicide of Captain Kemys.

Samuel Fritz, 1689
Between 1689 and 1691 the Jesuit priest Samuel Fritz traveled along the Amazon and its tributaries, preparing a detailed map at the request of the Royal Audiencia of Quito. Fritz was skeptical of the existence of a golden city, but thought that Lake Parime probably did exist, and included it prominently in his map.

18th century explorations

Nicholas Horstman, 1739
In November 1739, Nicholas Horstman (sometimes spelled "Hortsman"), a surgeon from Hildesheim, Germany who was secretly commissioned by the Dutch Governor of Guiana (Laurens Storm van 's Gravesande), traveled up the Essequibo River accompanied by two Dutch soldiers and four Indian guides. In April 1741 one of the Indian guides returned reporting that in 1740 Horstman had crossed over to the Rio Branco and descended it to its confluence with the Rio Negro. Rumors at the time held that Horstman had planted the Dutch Flag on the shores of Lake Parime, however later explorers determined that he had in fact visited Lake Amucu on the North Rupununi. Nothing further was heard until late November, 1742 when the other guides returned, reporting that Horstman and one of the Dutch soldiers had spent four months in a village on the Pará River, where they were discovered and arrested by the Portuguese authorities, and that they had "entered into the Portuguese service". In August 1743 Charles-Marie de La Condamine met and conversed with Horstman, who appeared to be living freely with the Portuguese in Pará, and Horstman gave him his fragmentary diary, titled "Journey which I made to the Imaginary Lake of Parima, or of Gold, in the Year 1739." Horstman states that on May 8, 1740,

Horstman also gave La Condamine a remarkably accurate hand-drawn map of his route from the coast through the interior of Northern Brazil. La Condamine then gave the map to the French geographer Jean Baptiste Bourguignon d'Anville. Lake Amucu was incorporated into his Carte de l'Amerique Meridionale in 1748.

Manuel Centurion, 1740
In 1740, Don Manuel Centurion, Governor of Santo Tomé de Guayana de Angostura del Orinoco in Venezuela, hearing a report from an Indian regarding Lake Parima, embarked on a journey up the Caura River and the Paragua River. According to Humboldt:

During his expedition, "several hundred persons perished miserably" and Centurion failed to confirm the existence of either a lake or a city.

Charles Marie de La Condamine, 1743
Between June and September 1743 the scientist and geographer Charles de La Condamine traveled from Quito to the Atlantic coast via the Amazon River, charting its course and making scientific observations. In his subsequent account of this journey, Abbreviated Relation of a Journey made in the Interior of South America (1745), Condamine discussed the existence of Lake Parime, stating that although the Indians had extracted "small flakes" of gold from the rivers, these stories had been greatly exaggerated to concoct the myth of a golden city:

During his journey La Condamine met and conversed with Nicholas Horstman and determined that he had found Lake Amucu in approximately the location of the reputed Lake Parime. On the map of his own travels included in his book, La Condamine placed a small lake as a source of the Takutu River, designating it only "Lac".

19th century explorations

Humboldt and Bonpland, 1799–1803

Alexander von Humboldt and Aimé Bonpland considered Lake Amucu in the North Rupununi, which had been visited by the German surgeon Nicholas Horstman, to be the Lake Parime described by Sir Walter Raleigh.<ref>Graham Watkins, Pete Oxford, and Reneé Bish, "Raleigh's El Dorado", from Rupununi: Rediscovering a Lost World, Earth in Focus Editions, 2010</ref> In his Relation historique du voyage aux régions équinoxiales du nouveau continent (1825), Humboldt found that Lake Amucu was in the same vicinity as the Lake Parime (or Roponowini) described to Raleigh, and was also a "large inland sea" when flooded; he noted that:

Charles Waterton, 1812
In 1812 Charles Waterton independently came to the same conclusion and proposed that seasonal flooding of the Rupununi savannah could be Lake Parime. Waterton wrote:

Robert Schomburgk, 1840
In 1840 explorer Robert Hermann Schomburgk visited Pirara on the shores of Lake Amucu.Peter Rivière, ed. The Guiana Travels of Robert Schomburgk, 1835–1844: Explorations on behalf of the Royal Geographical Society, 1835–1839, Ashgate Publishing, Ltd., 2006; p. 274.  He stated that the flooded Rupununi savannah which linked the Amazon and Essequibo River drainages was probably Lake Parime:

thumb|right|John Pinkerton's 1818 map of northern South America, one of the last maps to show Lake Parime (here named "Lake Parima or White Sea"). The existence of Manoa or El Dorado had by now been disproved, and most other maps of this period do not show Lake Parime.

Jacob van Heuvel, 1844
In 1844 the American author Jacob Adrien van Heuvel, a graduate of Yale and a law student, published an account of his travels in Guiana in which he investigated evidence for the existence of El Dorado and Lake Parima. The book described a journey to Guiana he had made in 1819–20 during which he questioned a "Charibe chief" named Mahanerwa about the existence of the lake. Mahanerwa drew a map in the sand, and stated that a large body of water lay southeast of the Orinoco. Van Heuvel considered Lake Parima and Lake Cassipa to be identical.

In his 1848 edition of Raleigh's The Discovery of the Large, Rich, and Beautiful Empire of Guiana, Schomburgk dismissed Van Heuvel's propositions:

In spite of well-publicized evidence disproving the existence of Lake Parime, the 1853 edition of the Encyclopædia Britannica described the lake under the entry for "America:"

Evidence for an ancient lake
Nhamini-wi and the Lake of Milk
The Tucano and Piratapuia tribes of the upper Rio Negro tell a story of the Nhamini-wi (the "narrow path"). The Nhamini-wi was a pre-Columbian road that traveled from the mountains in the west where the "house of the night" was located. The trail began at axpeko-dixtara, or the "lake of milk" in the east. In 1977 artist and explorer Roland Stevenson found ruins north of the Rio Negro in the Uaupés River basin that are believed to be the remnants of the Nhamini-wi. Led by indigenous guides Stevenson found old and collapsed stone walls that were dotted every twenty kilometers along an east-to-west line.

Stevenson followed traces of the road eastward and ended up in Roraima, Brazil, in the plains north of Boa Vista. He proposed that this line represents the water level of an extinct lake that existed until recent times. In the early 14th century, this giant lake began to drain due to epeirogenic movement. In June 1690, a massive earthquake opened a bedrock fault, forming a rift or a graben that permitted the water to flow into the Rio Branco. By the early 19th century it had dried up completely.

Geological evidence
Geologic research suggests that, thousands of years ago, conditions existed for the formation of a lake. Sedimentary rock in this region, known as the Takutu Basin or the Takutu Formation, dates back to the late Paleozoic, roughly 250 million years ago, and the basin connected with the Atlantic via the Takutu Graben. The geologic history of the Takutu Graben is known to have one phase of volcanic activity and three sedimentary depositional phases. Rifting due to tectonic plate divergence took place "in a lake or delta environment in the Late Triassic to Early Jurassic periods, between 200 million and one hundred and fifty million years ago." Starting around 66,000 years ago, sea level rise and more humid conditions created flooded zones north of the confluence of the Rio Negro and the Solimões River, in what is now Roraima.

Seasonal flooding was probably misidentified as a lake by some observers. The drainage system of the Rupununi Savannahs is unable to carry a high volume of surface runoff and as a result, most rivers flood in the wet season. In a few places ground water drainage is impeded by clay, and ponds and lakes persist for several months.

Archeological evidence

Roraima's well-known Pedra Pintada is the site of numerous pictograms and petroglyphs dating to between 9000 and 12000 years ago or less than 4000 years ago. Gold, which was reported to be washed up on the shores of the lake, was most likely carried by streams and rivers out of the mountains where it can be found today.

 Additional maps 
 Map from 1626 by John Speed showing Lake Parime, Lake Cassipa and Lake Eupana
 Map from 1635 by Willem Blaeu
 Map from 1652 by Nicolas Sanson showing "Lac ou Mer de Parime" and the city of El Dorado on the western shore
 Map from 1690 by Vincenzo Coronelli which mentions "La Città del Manoa del Dorado" and shows Lake Cassipa and Lake Xarayes
 Map from 1707 by Samuel Fritz
 Map from 1750 by Emanuel Bowen showing Lake Parima and the city of Manoa
 Map from 1751 by Giovanni Petroschi and Carolo Brentano, showing "Parime Lacus, ab auri opulentia fabulosus"''.
 Map from 1796 by Francisco Requena
 Map from 1807 by William Faden which shows the "Golden Lake or Lake Parime, called likewise Parana Pitinga i.e. White Sea, on the Banks of which the Discoverers of the 16th century did place the Imaginary city of Manoa del Dorado".
 Map from 1840 by Robert Schomburgk showing Lake Amucu

Notes

References

Parime
Exploration of South America
Lost places
Colonial Brazil
Geography of Guyana
Geography of Roraima
Geography of Venezuela
History of Guyana
History of Roraima
History of Venezuela
Parime
Maps of the history of the Americas
Fictional locations in South America
Former lakes of South America